Bianca Urbanke (born 17 September 1967) is a German handball player. She participated at the 1992 Summer Olympics, where the German national team placed fourth.

References

External links 
 
 
 

1967 births
Living people
German female handball players
Olympic handball players of Germany
Handball players at the 1992 Summer Olympics
Handball players at the 1996 Summer Olympics
Sportspeople from Brandenburg
People from Ludwigsfelde
People from Bezirk Potsdam
20th-century German women